Collegiata di San Michele Arcangelo may refer to:

 Collegiata di San Michele Arcangelo, Lucignano
 Collegiata di San Michele Arcangelo, Solofra

See also 

 San Michele Arcangelo (disambiguation)